Ashok Kumar Banker (born 7 February 1964 in Mumbai, India) is an author and screenwriter. His writing spans crime thrillers, essays, literary criticism, fiction and mythological retellings. The author of several well-received novels including a trilogy billed as "India's first crime novels in English", he became widely known for his retellings of Indian mythological epics, starting with the internationally acclaimed and best-selling eight-volume Ramayana Series. His books have sold over 2 million copies and have been published in 16 languages in 58 countries. His Epic India Library is an attempt at retelling all the myths, legends and itihasa of the Indian sub-continent in one story cycle comprising over 70 volumes.

Early life

Childhood
Banker was raised by his grandmother, May Agnes Smith. She married Mr. D'Souza, an Indian Christian from Goa, and the couple settled in Byculla in Mumbai. His grandmother financed the publication of his first book, a collection of poetry titled Ashes in the Dust of Time, which he self-published at age 15.

Career

Journalism
Ashok Banker worked as a freelance journalist and columnist for several years, for publications such as The Times of India and Outlook magazine. He was also a reviewer and commentator on contemporary Indian literature, an essayist, literary critic and reviewer.

Literary contribution
Banker is a contemporary Indian novelist. His work has been included in anthologies such as The Vintage Book of Modern Indian Literature and The Picador Book of Modern Indian Literature. His novel Vertigo, published in 1992, was praised by critics and readers including the late Dom Moraes.

Crime fiction
Banker has published in several genres, including crime thrillers. His Kali Rising is a contemporary radical feminist thriller series featuring only women protagonists. The first book, Blood Red Sari, was launched at the Tata Literature Live! literary festival in Mumbai in November 2012.

Science fiction, fantasy and horror
His Gods of War was released by Penguin in 2009.

Autobiographical work
Three of his novels contain autobiographical elements and are closely related to one another. His novel Vertigo is about a man struggling to make a successful career and home life in Bombay. Byculla Boy takes its name from the suburb he and his mother grew up in. Beautiful Ugly is a tribute to his mother.

Mythological retellings
Banker is best known for his Ramayana Series, a freely imaginative retelling of the ancient Sanskrit epic poem. It has spawned the burgeoning mythology genre.

Television work
Banker has been credited as the creator and scriptwriter (story, screenplay and dialogues) for A Mouthful of Sky, India's first television series in English, originally aired on DD Metro in the Indian sub-continent, retelecast on Star World. He was also co-writer of Malaysia's television series in English, titled City of the Rich, produced by UTV. Writing sporadically for television from the mid-1980s onwards, Banker scripted over 520 episodes of broadcast television for various series.

Feature films
In June 2013, Disney UTV purchased the rights to Banker's ongoing Mahabharata Series, with Banker commissioned to adapt the epic for release in 2016/17. Disney India CEO Siddhartha Roy Kapur was attached to produce and Director Abhishek Kapoor signed to direct the film. Banker has also confirmed that he has been commissioned by Rakeysh Omprakash Mehra to write the script for a forthcoming film.

Select bibliography

Poetry
 Ashes in the Dust of Time (1979)

Literary fiction
 Vertigo (1993)
 Byculla Boy (1994)

Young adult novels
 Amazing Adventure at Chotta Sheher (1992)
 The Missing Parents Mystery (1994)
 Vortal Shockwave (2013)

Ramayana series
 Prince of Ayodhya (2003)
 Siege of Mithila (2003)
 Demons of Chitrakut (2004)
 Armies of Hanuman (2005)
 Bridge of Rama (2005)
 King of Ayodhya (2006)
 Vengeance of Ravana (2011)
 Sons of Sita (2012)
 Ramayana Series: The Complete Omnibus (2013) (Ebook only)
 "Prince of Ayodhya: Volume I, The Graphic Novel" (2010)

Collected as omnibus volumes
 Prince of Dharma (2007)
 Prince in Exile (2007)
 Prince at War (2007)
 King of Dharma (2011) (Ebook only)

Krishna Coriolis series
 Slayer of Kamsa (2010)
 Dance of Govinda (2011)
 Flute of Vrindavan (2011)
 Lord of Mathura (2011)
 Rage of Jarasandha (2011)
 Fortress of Dwarka (2012)
 Rider of Garuda (2013)
 Lord of Vaikunta (Expected 2015)
 Krishna Coriolis: Complete Omnibus (Expected 2015)

Mahabharata series
Prequel Series
 The Forest of Stories (2011)
 The Seeds of War (2011)
 The Children of Midnight (2015)
Mahabharata Series
 The Darkness Before Dawn (2016)
 The Eclipse of Dharma (2016)
 The Sons of Misrule (Expected 2017)

Epic love stories
 Ganga and Shantanu (2013)
 Satyavati and Shantanu (2013)
 Shakuntala and Dushyanta (2013)
 Amba and Bhishma (2013)
 Devayani, Sharmistha and Yayati (2012)

Kali Rising
 Blood Red Sari (2012)
 Burnt Saffron Sky (2012) (Ebook only)
 Rust Black Heart (2013) (Ebook only)
 Silver Acid Rain (2013) (Ebook only)

Crime fiction
 The Iron Bra (1993)
 Murder & Champagne (1993)
 Ten Dead Admen (1993)

Itihasa series
 Ten Kings: Dasarajna (2012)
 ASHOKA: Lion of Maurya (2015)

Future history
 Gods of War (2009)
 Vengeance of Ravana (2009)
 VORTAL: Shockwave (2014)

Non-fiction books
 The Pocket Essential Bollywood (2001)
 The Valmiki Syndrome (2012)

Other works
 Gods of War(novel) (2009)
 A Mouthful of Sky -TV Series created and written by Banker (1995–96)
 "City of the Rich" -TV Series co-written by Banker (1996–98), credited as Malaysia's first Television Series in English.
 Bad Karma Online serial (first published on Top Write Corner website) (1998)
 Brandwarriors Magazine series published in The Advertising Brief, now defunct ad magazine published by Mid-day Group (1999)
 Swing City (2000) Book-length novel published as an online serial on Rediff.com
 Vortal (2000–01) Multimedia serial published in CD-Rom magazine "Mahazine"
 “Bombay Times”, a novel, published by AKB, in 2009 is about the rich society of Bombay.

Further reading
 Forbes India Celebrity 100 Nominees List
 Bollywood, the worst example of storytelling DNA, 22 April 2012
 Writing epics was healthier and more sustainable Bangalore Mirror, 22 April 2012
 "I have no caste, I am an Indian.", Interview in Hindustan Times, May 27, 2012 
 An epic rediscovery, Feature article in The Telegraph, April 14, 2013
 "View from the top : Colours of fiction" , Banker's views about bias: article at the Times of India website.
 Derogatory book reviews: article from the New Statesman website.
 Your favorite books, on the digital highway – Business of Life – livemint.com

See also
 List of Indian writers

References

Sunday, article in issue of January 1993.
 Society Magazine, cover story titled "Byculla Boy", August 1993.
 The Week, cover story, August 1993.

External links

 The official Ashok K. Banker website
 AKB eBOOKS: Website offering ebook editions of Banker's work
 Preview of Ashok Banker's upcoming book, Blood Red Sari

1964 births
Living people
Indian male novelists
Indian male journalists
Indian male screenwriters
Indian literary critics
Indian male essayists
Writers from Mumbai
Indian television writers
20th-century Indian novelists
20th-century Indian essayists
Journalists from Maharashtra
Novelists from Maharashtra
21st-century Indian novelists
20th-century Indian male writers
21st-century Indian male writers
Screenwriters from Maharashtra
Male television writers
Hill Grange High School alumni